Tony Quirk (born 11 February 1956) is an Australian former professional rugby league footballer who played in the 1970s.

Playing career
Anthony 'Tony' Quirk played for the St George Dragons at fullback for three seasons between 1975-1977. 

Initially used to replace recently retired captain-coach Graeme Langlands during 1976, Quirk played out the season at fullback, but by 1977 had lost his place in the first grade team to Ted Goodwin. 

He was used as a reserve during the 1977 Grand Final draw, and is remembered for a field goal attempt that would have won the match. It hit the cross-bar and the game ended in a draw.

He saw out his career at North Sydney for one season in 1978 before retiring.

References

St. George Dragons players
North Sydney Bears players
Australian rugby league players
Living people
1956 births
Rugby league fullbacks